A walkabout is an Australian aboriginal ritual of manhood.

Walkabout may also refer to:

Arts, entertainment, and media

Music

Albums
 Walkabout (Najwa Nimri album), 2006
 Walkabout (The Fixx album), 1986

Songs
 "Walkabout" (Atlas Sound song), a 2009 song on the album Logos by Atlas Sound
 "Walkabout", a song on the album One Hot Minute by the Red Hot Chili Peppers
 "Walkabout", a song on the album Stick Around for Joy by The Sugarcubes
 "Walkabout", a song on the album The Works by Nik Kershaw
 "Walkabout", a song on the album Pinnacles by Edgar Froese
 "Walkabout", a song on the album Augustines by Augustines, released 2014

Television 
"Walkabout" (Babylon 5), a 1996 episode of the Babylon 5 television series
"Walkabout" (Lost), a 2004 episode of the Lost TV series
"Walkabout" (Millennium), an episode of the Millennium television series
"Walkabout" (Robin Hood), an episode from the second series of 2006 television series Robin Hood
"Walkabout", an episode of Gargoyles animated television series

Other arts, entertainment, and media
Walkabout (film), a 1971 film by Nicolas Roeg and stage production based on the novel
Walkabout (magazine), an Australian travel magazine which ran from 1934 to 1974
Walkabout (novel), a 1959 book written by James Vance Marshall, set in the Australian outback
 Walkabout (dance)

Other uses 
Walkabout (pub chain), an Australian-themed pub chain
 Walkabout, a person's desire to travel without a planned itinerary or set destination; see wanderlust
 Billy Walkabout (1949–2007), thought to be the most decorated Native American soldier of the Vietnam War
 Walkabout Creek
 Walkabout Resources, Australian mining company